Richard Burgh (1725 – September 1762) was an Irish barrister and politician who was MP for Naas (1759–1762).

Biography
Burgh was the son of the military engineer and architect Colonel Thomas Burgh MP and his wife, Mary Smyth. He was educated at Trinity College, Dublin. He trained in law and worked as a barrister of Drumkeen, County Limerick.

In 1759, he succeeded his older brother, Thomas, as Member of Parliament for Naas in the Irish House of Commons, sitting until 1762. He left much of his property to his sister Elizabeth's son, Walter Hussey, on condition of him adopting the additional surname of Burgh.

References

1725 births
1762 deaths
Irish MPs 1727–1760
Irish MPs 1761–1768
Politicians from County Kildare
Members of the Parliament of Ireland (pre-1801) for County Kildare constituencies
Alumni of Trinity College Dublin
House of Burgh